Maplehurst may refer to:

Places
United Kingdom
 Maplehurst, West Sussex, England
United States
 Maplehurst, Wisconsin, a town
 Maplehurst (community), Wisconsin, an unincorporated community
  C.F. and Mary Singmaster House, near Keota, Iowa, also known as Maplehurst and as Maplehurst Ranch

See also
 Maplehurst Correctional Complex, correctional facility located in Ontario, Canada
 Maplehurst Wood, Site of Special Scientific Interest located in East Sussex, England